Lieutenant General Sir William Edmund Franklyn,  (14 May 1856 – 27 October 1914) was a senior British Army officer who served as Military Secretary from 1911 to 1914.

Early life and education
Franklyn was born in Ventnor, Isle of Wight, the eldest surviving son of Rev. Thomas Edmund Franklyn and Selina Elizabeth Hope. He was educated at Rugby School.

Military career
Franklyn was commissioned into the 19th Regiment of Foot in 1874, which in 1881 became the Yorkshire Regiment, and later still became the Green Howards, and was appointed Deputy Assistant Adjutant General at Aldershot in 1888. He was made Commanding Officer of the 2nd Battalion, Yorkshire Regiment and served on the North West Frontier in India in 1897. He was made Assistant Adjutant General for Scottish District in 1898 and Assistant Military Secretary at Army Headquarters in 1899.

Franklyn was appointed a Companion of the Order of the Bath in the 1902 Coronation Honours published on 26 June 1902, and received the decoration from King Edward VII at Buckingham Palace on 24 October 1902.

Franklyn became commander of 10th Infantry Brigade with the temporary rank of brigadier general on 15 October 1902. The brigade was based at Shorncliffe Army Camp, serving with the 5th Division within the II Army Corps. He was appointed Director of Personal Services at the War Office in 1904, General Officer Commanding 4th Division in 1906, General Officer Commanding 3rd Division in 1907, and Military Secretary in 1911. In 1914 he was appointed Governor of Malta, despite his lack of war experience, but never took up the appointment. He died later that year, shortly after the outbreak of the First World War.

Franklyn was given the colonelcy of the Alexandra, Princess of Wales's Own (Yorkshire Regiment) in 1906, a position he held until his death in 1914.

Personal life
In 1881, Franklyn married Helen Williams, daughter of Edwin Williams, with whom he had two sons and a daughter. He was the father of General Sir Harold Franklyn (1885–1963) and Brigadier Geoffrey Franklyn (1889–1967). His daughter, Dorothy Hope Franklyn (1883–1929), married George Edward Mervyn Thorneycroft and was the mother of politician Lord Thorneycroft.

References

|-
 

|-

 

1856 births
1914 deaths
People from Ventnor
People educated at Rugby School
Knights Commander of the Order of the Bath
British Army lieutenant generals
Green Howards officers
British Army generals of World War I
Military personnel from the Isle of Wight